The Wabash Avenue Bridge (officially, Irv Kupcinet Bridge) over the Chicago River was built in 1930.  Standing west of the Michigan Avenue Bridge and east of Marina City, the bascule bridge connects the Near North Side with "The Loop" area.

The single-deck, double-leaf bascule bridge was designed by Thomas Pihlfeldt and built by the Ketler and Elliot Company. The American Institute of Steel Construction awarded it the "Most Beautiful" bridge in 1930.

The control houses for controlling bridge operations are on the northwest and southwest corners of the bridge. The control houses are identical in design. In 1961 the control houses were upgraded to allow single man operation. Electrical modernization also accompanied this upgrade. While the northern control house is no longer in use, it still stands.

See also
List of bridges documented by the Historic American Engineering Record in Illinois

References

External links

Google Earth Model

1930 establishments in Illinois
Bascule bridges in the United States
Bridges completed in 1930
Bridges in Chicago
Historic American Engineering Record in Chicago
Road bridges in Illinois
Steel bridges in the United States